Osuga may refer to:

Osuga (Tvertsa), a tributary of the river Tvertsa in Russia
Osuga (Vazuza), a tributary of the river Vazuza in Russia
Osuga Glacier, a glacier in Victoria Land, Antarctica
osuga, a Luo name for a species of African nightshade